Lona-Lases (Lóna e Lasés in local dialect) is a comune (municipality) in Trentino in the northern Italian region Trentino-Alto Adige/Südtirol, located about  northeast of Trento.

Lona-Lases borders the following municipalities: Valfloriana, Sover, Segonzano, Cembra, Bedollo, Baselga di Pinè, Albiano and Fornace.

Demographic evolution

References

Cities and towns in Trentino-Alto Adige/Südtirol